Earle Benjamin Searcy was an American politician who served as clerk of the Supreme Court of Illinois, Illinois state senator, and Illinois state representative.

Early life
Searcy was born on May 4, 1887, in Palmyra, Illinois, the son of James Buchanan Searcy and Mary Elizabeth Searcy.

Searcy worked as a reporter for a newspaper in Springfield, Illinois. He also worked as a department editor for the Illinois State Highway Department.

He served in the United States Army during World War I.

He then worked as a real estate broker.

Political career
Searcy was a Republican.

In 1920 he was elected a Illinois state representative. In 1923, he was elected Illinois State Senator.

In 1936, he ran unsuccessfully in the Republican primary for Illinois Auditor of Public Accounts.

In 1940, he ran unsuccessfully in the Republican primary for lieutenant governor of Illinois.

In 1944 he was elected clerk of the Supreme Court of Illinois. He was reelected in 1950.

Personal life
He married Fae Searcy in 1917. They were parents to Barbara Jane Searcy Damewood and Earle B. Searcy.

He was a Christian.

He was a freemason (member of the Knights Templar), as well as a member of the Shriners, Elks, and Disabled American Veterans. He was one of the American Legion's founding members.

Death
Searcy died of a heart attack on April 11, 1955, at the age of 67. He died in office, and his wife was appointed clerk of the Supreme Court in a widow's succession. She would go on to be elected in her own right at the next election in 1956. She would be further reelected in 1962

He was interred at Oak Ridge Cemetery in Springfield, Illinois.

References

1887 births
1955 deaths
People from Macoupin County, Illinois
Military personnel from Illinois
Burials at Oak Ridge Cemetery
Republican Party members of the Illinois House of Representatives
Republican Party Illinois state senators
American Freemasons
Christians from Illinois
20th-century American politicians
American newspaper reporters and correspondents